The 1948 Purdue Boilermakers football team was an American football team that represented Purdue University during the 1948 Big Nine Conference football season.  In their second season under head coach Stu Holcomb, the Boilermakers compiled a 3–6 record, finished in a tie for fifth place in the Big Ten Conference with a 2–4 record against conference opponents, and were outscored by their opponents by a total of 175 to 126.

Notable players from the 1948 Purdue team included halfback Harry Szulborski and tackle Phil O'Reilly.

Schedule

Roster

Game summaries

Marquette
 Harry Szulborski 29 rushes, 171 yards

Minnesota
 Harry Szulborski 15 rushes, 160 yards

Indiana
 Harry Szulborski 34 rushes, 197 yards
 Norbert Adams 24 rushes, 148 yards

References

Purdue
Purdue Boilermakers football seasons
Purdue Boilermakers football